Artur Lossmann (also Arthur Lossmann; 5 October 1877 Vana-Vändra Parish, Pärnu County – 1 August 1972 London) was an Estonian military personnel (Major-General). He was one of the most prominent military medicine specialist in Estonia.

In 1904, he graduated from S. M. Kirov Military Medical Academy. From 1907 until 1914, he worked as a military physician in St. Petersburg. He participated on Russo-Japanese War, and in World War I as a soldier of the Russian Empire. LOssmann returned to Estonia and from 1918 until 1920, (during Estonian War of Independence) he was the chief physician of Tallinn 1st Military Hospital. From 1920 until 1935, he was the chief of the Healthcare Administration of the Militaries. In 1935 he retired. In 1944, following the Soviet occupation of Estonia, he fled to Germany, and in 1947, he emigrated to the United Kingdom, where he died in 1972.

In 1998, Lossmann's body was reinterred at the Defence Forces Cemetery of Tallinn, at the initiative of his daughter Nora Vanda Morley-Fletcher.

Awards
 1920: Cross of Liberty, I class II rank.

References

1877 births
1972 deaths
20th-century Estonian military personnel
Estonian physicians
Estonian military doctors
Estonian military personnel of World War I
Estonian military personnel of the Estonian War of Independence
Estonian World War II refugees
S.M. Kirov Military Medical Academy alumni
Estonian emigrants to the United Kingdom
People from Põhja-Pärnumaa Parish